Mount Ignatiev is a peak rising to 1220 m in the Srednogorie Heights on Trinity Peninsula, Antarctic Peninsula.  It is situated 3.3 km south-southeast of Corner Peak, 8.96 km east-southeast of Hanson Hill, 12.1 km north of Sirius Knoll and 7.17 km southwest of Crown Peak and surmounts Trajan Gate to the east, Malorad Glacier to the north and Russell West Glacier to the south.

The peak is named after the settlement of Graf Ignatievo in southern Bulgaria, in connection with the Russian diplomat Count Nikolay Ignatyev (1832-1908).

Location
German-British mapping in 1996.

Maps
 Trinity Peninsula. Scale 1:250000 topographic map No. 5697. Institut für Angewandte Geodäsie and British Antarctic Survey, 1996.
 Antarctic Digital Database (ADD). Scale 1:250000 topographic map of Antarctica. Scientific Committee on Antarctic Research (SCAR), 1993–2016.

References
 Bulgarian Antarctic Gazetteer. Antarctic Place-names Commission. (details in Bulgarian, basic data in English)
 Mount Ignatiev. SCAR Composite Antarctic Gazetteer

External links
 Mount Ignatiev. Copernix satellite image

Mountains of Trinity Peninsula
Bulgaria and the Antarctic